During the 2008–09 English football season, Bristol City F.C. competed in the Football League Championship.

Season summary
Bristol City ended the season in 10th place.

League table

First-team squad
Squad at end of season

Left club during season

References

Notes

Bristol City
Bristol City F.C. seasons